The Kyuyonelikeen (Küönelikeen), also spelled as Kyuenelikyan, is a river in Yakutia (Sakha Republic) and Krasnoyarsk Krai, Russia.

The river and its tributaries flow across uninhabited areas. The nearest settlement is Olenyok village, Olenyoksky District, located to the east of its mouth.

Course  
The Kyuyonelikeen is the largest right tributary of the Arga-Sala. Its sources are in the Central Siberian Plateau. The river flows roughly westwards in its uppermost section, then it bends and flows northwards or northwestwards all along its course.  before its mouth it is joined by the Alyylaakh, a tributary flowing from the west which is almost as long as the Kyuyonelikeen itself. Finally it joins the right bank of the Arga-Sala river downstream of the mouth of the Kukusunda,  from its mouth in the Olenyok.

Tributaries 

See also
List of rivers of Russia

References

External links 
Fishing & Tourism in Yakutia
Схема комплексного использования и охраны водных объектов, включая НДВ, бассейна реки Оленек (стр. 1 )
Рыболовный интернет клуб "Тугун"
 16136 - Полный список геологических отчетов (РОСНЕДРА)

Rivers of the Sakha Republic
Tributaries of the Arga-Sala
Central Siberian Plateau